Frans Peter von Knorring, (6 October 1792, Kokemäki - 29 March 1875) was a social reformer in Åland.

Biography
He was born on 6 October 1792. He was the vicar of Finström from 1834 to 1875 and he organized the educational system in Åland.  He started an elementary school at Godby in 1853. The school's syllabus included subjects related to farming.  A versatile man who published books on many subjects, such as linguistics, geography, pedagogy and economics, he also founded the first newspaper on Åland in 1868. He died on 29 March 1875.

Legacy
Two statues have been raised in his honour, one in Mariehamn and one at the church of Finström.

1792 births
1875 deaths
People from Kokemäki
Social reformers
People from Åland